Fishing bait is any substance used to attract and catch fish, e.g. on a fishing hook. Bait items are both selected from and placed within the environment to achieve enhanced prey capture success. Traditionally, fishing baits are natural fish food such as night-crawlers, insects, worms, and smaller bait fish that have been used for catching fish. Fishermen have also begun using processed food, plastic baits and more recently, bionic lures to attract fish. Despite the importance of fish's attraction to bait, the way fish react to different baits is quite poorly understood.

The various techniques and bait that a fisher may choose is dictated mainly by the target species and by its habitat. Bait can 

be separated into two main categories: artificial baits and natural baits. The alternative of artificial and live baits frequently 

demonstrate similar efficiency. The overall bait type and size will affect the efficiency and results of catches when fishing.  With these two common ways to fish also comes environmental concerns. It is known that some bait fish are invasive and have the possibility to spread disease. A common theme when inspecting the use of artificial baits is the discarding and loss of said baits. The disposing of lures can lead to problems in the ecosystem.

Artificial baits

Using lures is a popular method for catching predatory fish. Lures are artificial baits designed to mimic the action of different prey, usually small fish. These lures are made to use movement, color, vibration, noise, and sometimes scent to attract fish into striking. The lure may require a specialized presentation to impart an enticing action e.g. in fly fishing. Artificial lures are rigged with different types of hooks in order to increase catch rate. Artificial baits are manufactured to be durable and fished repeatedly unlike natural baits. Different companies are continuously modifying lures with new technology to better represent and attract the attention of fish. A study showed that the reason fish react to different colors of lures is due to their ability of see infrared rays being reflected off of lures. Companies have taken information like this into consideration so that they can make their lures in a way that maximizes efficiency. Some common artificial baits include: crank baits, soft plastic baits, swim baits, fake frogs, etc. Artificial baits are most commonly acquired online, in-store at tackle shops, and made by hand.

Environmental Effects 

See also: Human Impact on the Environment

Over time, the popularity of artificial baits has increased drastically. With this, concerns of harm to the environments have been brought up. One of these concerns comes from the loss or disposing of used baits into the environment. The discarding of line and lures, loss of baits, and snapping of line while hooked to a fish can cause potential harm to the ecosystem. Another concern would be towards the health of the fish. It is not uncommon to find lures and hooks lodged into the digestive tracts of fish when caught. Along with that, fish will swallow are get tangled in discarded fishing line.

Natural baits

The natural bait angler, with few exceptions, will use a common prey species of the fish as an attractant. The natural bait used may be alive or dead. Common natural baits include worms, leeches (notably bait-leech Nephelopsis obscura), minnows, frogs, salamanders, and insects. Natural baits are effective due to the lifelike texture, odor and color of the bait presented. Studies show that natural baits like croaker and shrimp are more recognized by the fish and are more readily accepted. Live bait being used to catch native species is a sustainable and desirable activity in a social and economical aspect. The availability of live bait and cost factor can inhibit the use of natural baits year round. Anglers can get various live baits from tackle shops at the limitations of price and season. Other ways anglers get natural bait is through methods of catching e.g. hook and line, fish traps and casting nets.

Spreading disease

The capture, transportation, and culture of bait fish can spread damaging organisms between ecosystems, endangering them. In 2007, several American states enacted regulations designed to slow the spread of fish diseases, including viral hemorrhagic septicemia, by bait fish. Because of the risk of transmitting Myxobolus cerebralis (whirling disease), trout and salmon should not be used as bait. The Non-indigenous Aquatic Nuisance Act of 1990 focuses on the effect of aquatic nuisance species. The introduction of these invasive species in various bodies of water have spread disease, killed fish, clogged water intakes, and covered beaches and boats.

Anglers may increase the possibility of contamination by emptying bait buckets into fishing venues and collecting or using bait improperly. The transportation of fish from one location to another can break the law and cause the introduction of fish alien to the ecosystem. There has been legislation passed within the last couple years in attempt of protecting big and small fisheries.

Gallery 
Some common baits that fish will go after.

References

External links
 Commonly used fishing baits in the United Kingdom 

Fishing equipment